Octave van Rysselberghe (22 July 1855 – 30 March 1929) was a Belgian architect of the Art Nouveau period. He is one of the representatives of the architectural renewal that characterized the end of the 19th century, with Victor Horta, Paul Hankar and Henry Van de Velde.

Biography
Octavius Josephus van Rysselberghe was born in Minderhout, near Antwerp, on 22 July 1855.

He was the older brother of the neo-impressionist painter Théo van Rysselberghe (1862–1926) and the younger brother of fellow architect Charles van Rysselberghe and scientist François van Rysselberghe, pioneer of meteorology and long-distance telephony.

He studied at the Royal Academy of Fine Arts in Ghent and was trained by Adolphe Pauli in the neoclassical tradition, inspired by the Italian Renaissance. In 1875, together with Ernest Allard, he won second prize in the competition of the Prix de Rome for architecture. At the next edition for architecture, in 1879, he again took second prize, together with Eugène Dieltiens.

After a stay in Italy, he was a trainee with Joseph Poelaert as part of the construction of the Palais de Justice in Brussels before starting the construction of the Hôtel Goblet d'Alviella for the Count Goblet d'Alviella in 1882. Between 1882 and 1889 he built the Royal Observatory in Uccle, in eclectic and neoclassical styles. In 1893 he built a studio for his brother Théo van Rysselberghe in Saint Clair, France. He built an Art Nouveau house in Brussels, the Hotel Otlet, in 1894. The interior design was done by Henry Van de Velde. He collaborated with Van de Velde also for the Hôtel De Brouckère in Brussels, likewise in a classic and sober Art Nouveau style.

Octave van Rysselberghe was soon regarded as one of the most important representatives of Art Nouveau in Belgium. From 1895 to 1905, he built tourist establishments for the Compagnie des Grands Hôtels Européens in Ostend, Cherbourg, Monte Carlo, Saint Petersburg and Tunis.

Selected works 

 1882: Hôtel Goblet d'Alviella in Saint-Gilles, Brussels, Belgium
 1885: Winkelhuis in Ghent, Belgium
 1894–98: Hotel Otlet in Brussels, Belgium
 1898: Hôtel De Brouckère in Brussels, Belgium
 1906: Villa Le Pachy in Bellecourt, Belgium
 1906: Concert hall of the Royal Conservatory of Ghent (current Miry Concert Hall)
 1907: Villa Beukenhoek in Uccle, Belgium
 1908: Residence Kreuzberg in Dudelange, Luxembourg
 1909–11: Grand Hôtel Bellevue in Westende, Belgium
 1910: Villa Le Pin in Le Lavandou, France
 1910: Burgerhuis on Koningin Elisabethlaan in Ghent, Belgium
 1912: Van Rysselberghe House in Ixelles, Brussels, Belgium

Further reading
 L. Van der Swaelmen: Octave Van Rysselberghe, architecte, La Cité, xi (1929)
 J. Stevens en E. Henvaux: Octave Van Rysselberghe, 1855–1929, A+, xvi (1978)

References

1855 births
1929 deaths
19th-century Belgian architects
20th-century Belgian architects
People from Antwerp